BSH may refer to:

 Bacillithiol, a thiol compound found in bacteria
 Bayley Seton Hospital on Staten Island, New York, US
 Belarusian Socialist Hramada, a political party
 Bishan MRT station, station abbreviation
 BSH Bosch and Siemens Home Appliances
 British Society for Haematology
 Bushey railway station, station code
 Bushel, a unit of dry volume
 Federal Maritime and Hydrographic Agency of Germany
 BSh, Köppen climate classification for hot semi-arid climates